Grad (formerly Gornja Lendava) is a village in the Municipality of Grad in the Prekmurje region of northeastern Slovenia. It is the seat of the municipality and is the largest and oldest settlement in the Goričko region.

Name
Grad was first mentioned in written sources as Lyndwa, and later as Gornja Lendava (literally 'upper Lendava', contrasting with Dolnja Lendava, literally 'lower Lendava'). The name of the settlement was changed from Gornja Lendava to Grad in 1952.

Grad Castle
Grad means 'castle' in Slovene and refers to the castle dating from the late 12th century strategically situated on a hill overlooking the settlement. It is one of the largest castle complexes in Slovenia, with 365 rooms. After World War II, the castle was divided into small residential apartments. With Slovenia joining the European Union, funds have been made available for the restoration of the castle. Certain parts of the castle are open to the public.

Church
A pilgrimage church dedicate to the Assumption of Mary stands in the center of the village. It is one of the highest-quality examples of Gothic architecture in the Mura Valley.

Notable people
Notable people that were born or lived in Grad include:
György Almásy (1867–1933), ethnographer and zoologist
István Szelmár (1820–1877), writer
István Zsemlics (1840–1891), writer
Dénes Szécsi ( 1410–1465), cardinal

References

External links
Grad on Geopedia

Populated places in the Municipality of Grad